Welkait (also spelled Wolkait or Wolqayt;  is a woreda which was historically part of the northern Amhara region of Gonder in Ethiopia. Following the fall of the communist Derg regime and ascension to power of the Tigray Peoples Liberation Front (TPLF), the region was unilaterally annexed into the Tigray Region in Ethiopia by the TPLF. It is believed this annexation was for geopolitical purposes with the primary goal of obtaining a direct border with Sudan. The TPLF also annexed areas from the other regions in the country for similar purposes. Efforts to integrate Welkait into Tigray were widespread and systematic, including the expulsion and intimidation of the majority Amhara population and the re-naming of cities, rivers, lakes, mountains, springs,  etc from their original Amharic to Tigrigna. Over the past two years of conflict in Northern Ethiopia, Welkait was reintegrated back into its historic borders and is currently administered as part of the Amhara Region. This woreda is bordered to the north by Humera and to the south by Tsegede. It is bordered on the east by the North West Zone; the woredas of Tahtay Adiyabo and Asgede Tsimbla lie to the north-east, on the other side of the Tekezé River, and Tselemti to the east. The administrative center of Welkait is Addi Remets; other towns in the woreda include Mai'gaba and Awura.

Overview 
Welkait is known for its fertile alluvial soil, which grows cash crops such sesame, cotton and also sorghum.

Demographics 
Based on the 2007 census conducted by the Central Statistical Agency of Ethiopia (CSA), this woreda has a total population of 138,926, an increase of 90,186 over the 1994 national census, of whom 70,504 are men and 68,422 women; 10,758 or 7.74% are urban inhabitants. A total of 30,375 households were counted in this woreda, resulting in an average of 4.57 persons in a household, and 29,336 housing units. The majority of the inhabitants said they practiced Ethiopian Orthodox Christianity, with 97.28% reporting that as their religion, while 2.71% of the population were Muslim.

The 1994 national census reported a total population for this woreda of 90,186, of whom 45,657 were men and 44,529 were women; 4,597 or 5.1% of its population were urban dwellers. The ethnic make up of the region is widely disputed. Documentation shows that following the annexation of the area into the Tigray region, a mass effort was undertaken to re-populate the area with a majority Tigray ethnic migrants while displacing the local Amhara population. Various steps were taken to dramatically change the demographic make up of the region including, a change to the official language for regional administration and teaching in public schools to Tigrigna and repossession of land from the majority Amhara farming population. Notably, records going back into the 1980’s show that the region was populated predominantly by ethnic Amhara. As a result of these mass efforts, the ethnic demographic of the region was dramatically altered. The 2007 census data indicates that the ethnic groups reported in Welkait are now Tigray (96.58%), Amhara (3.03%); and all other ethnic groups made up only 0.39% of the population. Tigrinya is spoken as a major language by 97.14%, and 2.75% speak Amharic; the remaining 0.11% spoke all other primary languages reported. 96.75% of the population said they were Ethiopian Orthodox Christians, and 3.09% were Muslim. Concerning education, 3.9% of the population were considered literate, which is less than the Zone average of 9.01%; 3.36% of children aged 7–12 were in primary school, which is less than the Zone average of 11.34%; a negligible number of the children aged 13–14 were in junior secondary school, which is also less than the Zone average of 0.65%; and a negligible number of children aged 15–18 were in senior secondary school, which is less than the Zone average of 0.51%. Concerning sanitary conditions, about 1% of the urban houses and about 8% of all houses had access to safe drinking water at the time of the census; about 4% of the urban and about 4% of all houses had toilet facilities.

Ethnicity 

*Urban and Rural Mi'irabawi Zone statistics because none are available for Welkait specifically.

Mother Language 

*Urban and Rural Mi'irabawi Zone statistics because none are available for Welkait specifically.

Religion

Economy

Agriculture 
A sample enumeration performed by the CSA in 2001 interviewed 24,417 farmers in this woreda, who held an average of 0.99 hectares of land. Of the 24,286 hectares of private land surveyed, over 86.69% was in cultivation, 1.27% pasture, 10.37% fallow, 0.03% in woodland, and 1.65% was devoted to other uses. For the land under cultivation in this woreda, 63.29% was planted in cereals, 4.19% in pulses, 18.24% in oilseeds, and 0.17% in vegetables is missing. The area planted in gesho was 25 hectares; the area in fruit trees is missing. 79.64% of the farmers both raised crops and livestock, while 10.96% only grew crops and 9.4% only raised livestock. Land tenure in this woreda is distributed amongst 73.93% owning their land, 25.09% renting, and 0.98% reported as holding their land under other forms of tenure. The intensive agriculture is necessary to feed people of the region due to the burgeoning human population, but continuing conversion of natural lands to agriculture is taking a toll on biodiversity in the area.

Sugar industry 
The Ethiopian Sugar Corporation is building a sugar mill in Welkait region.

Transportation

Ground Travel 
In May 2010 construction was underway on a 98-kilometer road westwards from Adi Remets to Dejena Densha; construction of a road in the other direction, eastwards from Adi Remets to Dedebit in Asgede Tsimbla woreda, was awarded that month to Sur Construction for 801 million birr.

2020 woreda reorganisation 
In 2020, Welkait woreda became inoperative and its territory belongs to the following new woredas:
Welkait (new, smaller, woreda)
Awra woreda
Korarit woreda
May Gaba town

References

Districts of Tigray Region